Alan Ariel Hernández Rodríguez (born 19 January 1992) is a Panamanian former footballer who played as an attacker.

Career

Club career

Hernández started his career with Panamanian side Atlético Chiriquí after almost joining the youth academy of Ajax in The Netherlands.
In 2011, he signed for Italian Serie A side Chievo. In 2012, Hernández was sent on loan to Vallée d'Aoste in the Italian third tier, where he made 3 league appearances and scored 0 goals. On 23 September 2012, he debuted for Vallée d'Aoste during a 0–2 loss to Rimini. In 2013, Hernández signed for Panamanian club Universitario (Panama), helping them win the league.

International career

He represented Panama at the 2011 FIFA U-20 World Cup.

References

External links
 

A.C. ChievoVerona players
Association football forwards
Atlético Chiriquí players
Expatriate footballers in Italy
Lega Pro Seconda Divisione players
Panama youth international footballers
Panamanian expatriate footballers
Panamanian expatriate sportspeople in Italy
Panamanian footballers
S.C. Vallée d'Aoste players
Unión Deportivo Universitario players
Living people

1992 births